Oxalicibacterium horti is a Gram-negative, rod-shaped, non-spore-forming, yellow-pigmented bacterium from the genus Oxalicibacterium and family Oxalobacteraceae. O. horti uses potassium oxalate as a sole carbon source. Its 16S rRNA gene sequence analysis has shown that it belongs to the order of Betaproteobacteria, most closely to Oxalicibacterium flavum.

References

External links
Type strain of Oxalicibacterium horti at BacDive -  the Bacterial Diversity Metadatabase

Burkholderiales
Bacteria described in 2009